HD 5388 is a single star in the southern constellation of Phoenix. It has the Gould designation 78 G. Phoenicis, while HD 5388 is the star's Henry Draper Catalogue identifier. This object has a yellow-white hue and is too faint to be readily visible to average human eyesight, having an apparent visual magnitude of 6.73. It is located at a separation of 173 light years from the Sun based on parallax, and is drifting further away with a radial velocity of +39 km/s.

This object is an ordinary F-type main-sequence star with a stellar classification of F6V, indicating that it is generating energy through core hydrogen fusion. It is not chromospherically active and its metal content is half as much as the Sun. The star is larger and more massive than the Sun, and radiates 4.8 times the Sun's luminosity from its photosphere at an effective temperature of 6297 K.

In 2009, a substellar object (HD 5388 b) thought to be a gas giant planet was detected in orbit around the star using the HARPS instrument at La Silla Observatory. This was later demonstrated to be a brown dwarf rather than a planet.

See also 
 HD 181720
 HD 190984

References 

F-type main-sequence stars
Brown dwarfs
Phoenix (constellation)
CD-48 00216
005388
004311
Phoenicis, 78